From 2012 to 2017 BTCjam was a peer-to-peer lending (aka "P2P lending") service where individuals could borrow or lend using bitcoin. The company claimed it intended to let users in countries that lack a local credit score system to receive loans. Its claimed mission was to make credit affordable and accessible everywhere. According to one source, BTCJam was "the first P2P lending platform to cross national borders successfully.

BTCjam was part of the 500 Startups accelerator program and received investments from Ribbit Capital, Foundation Capital, Pantera Capital, and other venture capital firms. It has facilitated bitcoin loans for more than US$14,000,000 in over 120 countries.

BTCJam closed on 2017, claiming regulatory difficulties operating out of various jurisdictions.

History 
BTCjam was founded in late 2012.

In October 2013, BTCjam was accepted into the 500 Startups accelerator program and secured seed financing from Ribbit Capital, 500 Startups, FundersClub and Bitcoin Investment Trust.

By 2016, the company had serviced more than 16,000 loans across 121 countries, many in areas typically considered to be unbanked, and had been described as "by far the largest microloan/microfinance site powered by Bitcoin.

In March 2016, BTCjam stopped accepting customers from the United States for regulatory reasons.

In 2017 the company shut down entirely and ceased operations.

See also 
 Comparison of crowdfunding services
 Disintermediation

References

External links 
 

Companies based in San Francisco
Financial services companies established in 2012
Financial services companies disestablished in 2017
Privately held companies of the United States
Peer-to-peer lending companies
Financial services companies based in California
American companies established in 2012
Bitcoin companies